Roger Martin Wartell is the former Chair of the School of Biology, part of the College of Sciences at the Georgia Institute of Technology.

Biography

Early life
Roger Wartell was born in New York, New York. He received his B.S. degree in physics from Stevens Institute of Technology in 1966.  In 1971 he received his Ph.D in physics from the University of Rochester, where he worked in the group of Elliott Waters Montroll on the DNA helix-coil transition. From 1971 to 1973 he was a NIH postdoctoral fellow in the laboratory of Robert Wells at the University of Wisconsin-Madison. He was a visiting professor at the University of Wisconsin-Madison in 1978-1979, and visiting scholar at National Institutes of Health-Bethesda from 1987 to 1988.

Georgia Tech
Wartell joined the faculty at Georgia Tech in 1974, and received a NIH Career Development Award in 1979. He served as associate chair of the Georgia Institute of Technology School of Physics from 1987-1988. With a 1/3 joint appointment in biology, he was appointed acting chair of the Georgia Tech School of Biology in 1990. Under his tenure as chair (1990–2004), the undergraduate curriculum was revised to provide students with three areas of emphasis: environmental biology, microbiology, and molecular biology and faculty size increased from 12 to 26. The areas reflected the research and educational interests of the faculty.

He is a member of the NASA Astrobiology Institute at Georgia Tech. His research is focused on protein-RNA interactions in gene regulation, ribosomal evolution, and ribozyme reactions in ice.

Notable awards
 NIH Career Development Award, 1979.

Notable publications

References

External links
 Roger Wartell's Faculty Page at Georgia Tech
 Georgia Tech School of Biology

American biochemists
American biophysicists
Georgia Tech faculty
Living people
Stevens Institute of Technology alumni
University of Rochester alumni
Year of birth missing (living people)